Petra Lobinger née Laux; divorced Schneider (born 24 January 1967)) is a German retired athlete who specialised in the triple jump. She represented her country at the 1996 Summer Olympics, as well as two World Championships, in 1993 and 1997. Her biggest success is the fifth place at the 1997 World Indoor Championships.

Career
Her personal bests in the event are 14.31 metres outdoors (Mainz 1997) and 14.36 metres indoors (Paris 1997). The latter is a former national record which stood for almost 14 years, only being beaten in 2011 by Katja Demut.

In 1994 she married the former pole vaulter, Tim Lobinger, and had two children together. The couple divorced in 2003. Their son Lex-Tyger Lobinger is a professional footballer.

Competition record

References

External links
 

Living people
1967 births
Sportspeople from Siegen
German female triple jumpers
German national athletics champions
Athletes (track and field) at the 1996 Summer Olympics
Olympic athletes of Germany